Operation Nazi Zombies is an independently produced Nazi Zombie originally titled Maplewoods and was recorded in 1999 in Bucks County, Pennsylvania before being released in 2003.

Plot
A special forces unit is sent on a mission to a research testing facility to fight the undead.

Cast
 Thomas Reily as General Gibbs
 Elissa Mullen as Lieutenant Meyer
 Christopher Connolly as Chaplain Johnson
 John Weidemoyer as Mayor O'Malley

Reception
Horrornews.net praised the film's special FX. Ain't It Cool News reviewed the film, stating that they "love productions like this because one can see that it is driven by a dedicated soul, doing a little bit of everything to make his dream happen. The end result is not perfect, but everyone involved seem to be giving it their all and a deep love of horror exudes from every frame."

See also
 List of zombie Nazi films

References

External links

2003 films
2003 horror films
Nazi zombie films
2000s English-language films